The Palace of the Borgias (officially and in Valencian, Palau de les Corts Valencianes, Palau de Benicarló or Palau dels Borja) is an aristocratic palace of Catalan Gothic and Renaissance styles located in the city of Valencia, Spain. It is now the headquarters of the Valencian Parliament.

The palace was constructed in the 15th century to be the residence of the Borgia family in the capital of the Kingdom of Valencia.

See also 
 Valencian Parliament
 House of Borgia
 Route of the Borgias

References

External links 

 Official website of the Valencian Parliament 

Bien de Interés Cultural landmarks in the Province of Valencia
Palaces in the Valencian Community
House of Borgia
Route of the Borgias
Seats of Spanish regional legislatures